Kamille may refer to:
 Kamille (musician)
 Kamille (wrestler)